Dnipro National University of Railway Transport named after academician V. Lazaryan (DIIT) (Ukrainian: Дніпровський національний університет залізничного транспорту імені В. Лазаряна, previously Dnipropetrovsk University) is a higher educational institution of the 4th (maximum) level of state accreditation in Ukraine.

It was founded in 1930 as the Institute of Railway Transport Engineers.

Structure 
The structure of the University comprises 11 departments:

 Bridges and Transport Tunnels

 Electrification of Railway Transport

 Mechanical Engineering

 Railway Traffic Control

 Railway Track Construction and Maintenance

 Civil and Industrial Engineering

 Economics and Management in Transport

 Technical Cybernetics

 Humanities and work with foreign students

 Extra-Mural Training of Specialists and Up-grading Qualification Department

See also
 Open access in Ukraine

References 

Universities and colleges in Dnipro
Educational institutions established in 1930
National universities in Ukraine
1930 establishments in Ukraine
Engineering universities and colleges in Ukraine
Railway schools